Un Verano Sin Ti is the fourth solo studio album, and fifth overall, by Puerto Rican rapper and singer Bad Bunny. It was released on May 6, 2022, by Rimas Entertainment following the release of his previous record El Último Tour Del Mundo (2020). Comprising twenty-three tracks, the album is primarily a reggaeton, cumbia and indie pop record, and contains guest appearances from Chencho Corleone, Jhayco, Tony Dize, Rauw Alejandro, Bomba Estéreo, the Marías and Buscabulla.

A critical and commercial success, Un Verano Sin Ti debuted atop the US Billboard 200, marking Bad Bunny's second number-one album and the second all-Spanish language album to top the chart. It spent 13 weeks atop the chart and topped the Billboard 200 Year-End Chart as the best-performing album of the year, the first Spanish language album to do so. It was also the first album by a Latin artist to reach 10 billion streams on Spotify. At the 23rd Annual Latin Grammy Awards, Un Verano Sin Ti won Best Urban Music Album, while at the 65th Annual Grammy Awards, it became the first Spanish-language album to earn a Grammy nomination for Album of the Year. Un Verano Sin Ti is world's best-selling album of 2022, making Bad Bunny the first Latino to have won a IFPI Global Chart Award.

Background 
Bad Bunny first teased Un Verano Sin Ti on January 24, 2022, when he posted a teaser announcing his upcoming 2022 stadium tour World's Hottest Tour: "now yes, 2022 has started". He called the album "a record to play in the summer, on the beach, as a playlist". The music video for "Moscow Mule" was filmed in Miami, Florida and Puerto Rico.

Composition 

Un Verano Sin Ti is primarily a reggaeton, cumbia, and indie pop record, driven by musical styles hailing from the Caribbean, such as reggae, bomba, calypso, soca, dembow, mambo, merengue, and bachata. The album also contains elements of a cappella, afrobeats, alternative rock, ambient, ballad, bossa nova, chillwave, dancehall, dance-pop, disco, electronic, hip-hop, house, lo-fi, psychedlia, R&B, samba, sandungueo, soul, synth-pop, synthwave, techno, and trap.

Artwork 
The artwork for Un Verano Sin Ti features a sad one-eyed heart in front of a vibrant beach setting with the light blue ocean, beaming sunset, breezy palm trees, happy dolphins, and pink flowers that was designed by the L.A.-based artist and graphic designer Adrian Hernandez, professionally known as Ugly Primo, with whom Bad Bunny has been in a friendship with since 2018. Although designed by Hernandez himself, Bad Bunny claims that the idea of the album cover was all his. Ideas for the album cover were conceived as early as the summer of 2021 when Bad Bunny had reached out to Hernandez with the idea of the cover and how he wanted it to look like. Hernandez explains even further that he made about seven versions, in different styles and aesthetics, based on a drawing that Bad Bunny gave him, and a little after six months, the cover art of Un Verano Sin Ti was finally finished and unveiled to the public on May 4, 2022, just two days before the official release of the album.

Critical reception 

Un Verano Sin Ti was met with critical acclaim. At Metacritic, which assigns a normalized rating out of 100 to reviews from professional publications, the album received an average score of 85, based on seven reviews, indicating "universal acclaim".

David Crone of AllMusic writes, "Un Verano is not only a seasonal statement-piece but a testament to Benito's singular songwriting -- across genres, generations, and even languages, he works to produce enduring landmarks that trace universal joys, sorrows, and passions." Lucas Villa of Consequence praised the album's musical versatility, highlighting that "Side B is the more adventurous half of the album, pushing Bad Bunny's sound into new places with collaborations with alternative acts. ... With the sun-kissed Un Verano Sin Ti, Bad Bunny continues to proudly give pop music some much-needed flavor, swagger, and sounds by way of the Caribbean." Honored with its "Best New Music" tag, Jennifer Mota of Pitchfork echoes Villa's remarks, writing that the album is a "cohesively packaged voyage through the various sounds synonymous with the Caribbean region—reggaetón, reggae, bomba, Dominican dembow, Dominican mambo, and bachata, among others.

Julyssa Lopez of Rolling Stone praised the album, but noted that it "does fall into some of the problems of modern reggaeton. Many have pointed out that though Bad Bunny draws inspiration from the Dominican Republic in particular, no Dominicans appear in the actual features. And the length of the album produces some lulls and selections that are pretty mid: Unsurprisingly, the most mainstream reggaeton songs on here land among the least interesting."

Year-end lists

Awards and nominations 
Un Verano Sin Ti is the first Spanish-language album nominated for the Grammy Award for Album of the Year.

Commercial performance 
Un Verano Sin Ti debuted at number one on the US Billboard 200 with 274,000 album-equivalent units. It is Bad Bunny's second number-one album and the second all-Spanish language album to top the Billboard 200. The album also achieved the biggest streaming week for a Latin album ever, accumulating 356.66 million official streams in the United States, the most for any album since Drake's Certified Lover Boy (2021), and was the most-streamed album on Spotify in 2022 by that point. It spent 13 nonconsecutive weeks atop the chart, becoming the album with the most weeks at No. 1 in 2022 and the ninth album overall to spend more than 10 weeks on top of the chart since 2000. Un Verano Sin Ti is also the first album to spend its first six months on the chart in the top two, since the Billboard 200 began publishing in 1956. It topped the 2022 Billboard 200 Year-End Chart, the first all-Spanish album to do so. In addition, it also placed at No. 1 on the year-end Independent Albums, Top Latin Albums and Latin Rhythm Albums charts.

According to the magazine Hits, Un Verano Sin Ti sold 3.8 million units as of January 2023, making it the best-selling non-English-language album in U.S. history, surpassing Linda Ronstadt's Canciones de Mi Padre at 2.5 million units.

The album reached number one on the Spanish Albums Chart and has received a five-times platinum certification for having moved 200,000 units in the country. Un Verano Sin Ti became Bad Bunny's first album to reach the top 10 on the music charts of Canada, Italy, the Netherlands, and Switzerland.

Track listing

Charts

Weekly charts

Year-end charts

Certifications and sales

See also 
 List of Billboard 200 number-one albums of 2022
 List of best-selling albums in Mexico

References 

2022 albums
Bad Bunny albums
Albums produced by Lil' C (record producer)
Albums produced by Tainy
Reggaeton albums
Cumbia albums
Indie pop albums by Puerto Rican artists
Latin Grammy Award for Best Urban Music Album